Plus Pool, often stylized as + POOL, is an initiative to bring a floating swimming pool to the East River, on the Manhattan and/or Brooklyn banks, in New York City; a permanent location has yet to have been determined. The  pool would be filled with water filtered from the river it floats in. The two companies behind it, Family New York and PlayLab, have been using the crowdfunding website Kickstarter to raise money for the project.

Concept
The planned cross-shaped, Olympic-sized pool would be used to clean the waters of the East River while providing a public space for water-based recreation. With its current design, the pool would flush out up to half a million gallons of river water daily through a layered filtration system. Over a quarter of a million gallons of filtered river water would be used to fill the pool itself. The planned long-term goal is to raise a total of $15 million to fund the entire pool by 2016.

History
In July 2011, the team raised over $41,000 on Kickstarter to test filtration materials using water from the East River. With the help of researchers at Columbia University, the tests yielded feasibility, and in July 2013 over a quarter million dollars was raised to build a 35 square foot miniature version of the floating pool. The "test lab" is to be a working prototype to analyze its effectiveness in river conditions.

Since its conception, several independent companies have participated in the Plus Pool project, including engineering firm Arup, design firm IDEO, environmental consultants from One Nature, and art institution Storefront for Art and Architecture. The project has also been met with interest from government officials, notably New York State Senator Daniel Squadron and New York City Council Member Brad Lander.

In November 2013, Time magazine ranked Plus Pool as one of the 25 best inventions of the year 2013.

The pool was projected to open in mid-2016. Not much visible progress was made through 2016, but in April 2017, it was announced that a partnership with Heineken was formed.

In 2019, the founders of Plus Pool introduced a light sculpture in the East River. Funded by the National Endowment of the Arts, Heineken and the Howard Hughes Corporation, the sculpture changes colors based on water conditions. The system and the algorithm behind it was developed by scientists at Columbia University and developers and designers at the tech firm Reaktor.

The city approved a location for the pool north of the Manhattan Bridge on the Lower East Side in 2021. The team proceeded to work on regulatory thresholds for the river and pool bathers.

References

External links
 
 Swim in the River
 Family New York
 PlayLab

Kickstarter-funded public works
Proposed buildings and structures in New York City
Swimming venues in New York City
Parks in Manhattan
Parks in Brooklyn
East River